National Division 2 is the fourth tier of rugby league in France, below the National Division 1. The season runs from September to April. The Division is split into 5 regional leagues, Languedoc-Roussillon, Midi-Pyrenees, Aquitaine, Ile de France and Provence-Alpes-Côte d'Azur (PACA). Clubs play each other home and away in their respective regional league with the top clubs progressing into a series of play-off matches to determine the champions. The champions can apply for promotion to the National Division 1. This tier was formerly known as the Federal Championship.

History 

The league was first played for in 1974/75 under the title Federal Division. In 2008 the competition was rebranded as the National Division 2. The domestic cup for clubs in the league is the Coupe Falcou which was formerly called the French Federal Cup.

Teams

Zone 1

Zone 2

Zone 3

Past winners

See also

Rugby league in France
France national rugby league team
France women's national rugby league team
French Rugby League Championship
Elite One Championship
Elite Two Championship
National Division 1
Lord Derby Cup
Coupe Falcou
Paul Dejean Cup
French rugby league system

References

External links

Rugby league competitions in France